The 2015 Mubadala World Tennis Championship was a non-ATP affiliated exhibition tournament. It was the 7th edition of the Mubadala World Tennis Championship with the world's top players competing in the event, which was held in a knockout format. The winner received a purse of $250,000. The event was held at the Abu Dhabi International Tennis Complex at the Zayed Sports City in Abu Dhabi, United Arab Emirates.

Players

Champion

 Andy Murray def.  Novak Djokovic by walkover
Murray wins his second title in Abu Dhabi.

References

External links
Official website

World Tennis Championship
2015 in Emirati tennis
World Tennis Championship